Pierre Bellot (born 8 November 1968) is a former French Paralympic swimmer who competed at international elite events. He was a four-time Paralympic champion.

Bellot was born without his arms and only has one leg, he practiced to do everyday tasks with his mouth and leg since he was a child. He is now a self-taught painter and has art exhibitions all around Europe and his artwork has been on display at the European Parliament in Strasbourg four times. He was award the National Order of Merit in 1996 by Jacques Chirac after winning five medals at the Paralympics.

References

1968 births
Living people
People from Longjumeau
Paralympic swimmers of France
Swimmers at the 1992 Summer Paralympics
Swimmers at the 1996 Summer Paralympics
Medalists at the 1992 Summer Paralympics
Medalists at the 1996 Summer Paralympics
French male painters
French male freestyle swimmers
French male backstroke swimmers
French male butterfly swimmers
S4-classified Paralympic swimmers
Sportspeople from Essonne
20th-century French people